Sunnynook is a suburb on the North Shore in the Auckland metropolitan area in New Zealand. It is currently under the governance of Auckland Council.

The suburb is centred on the Sunnynook Shopping Centre and the nearby Sunnynook Park. A skateboard bowl is located in the park, which is also home to the Glenfield Greyhounds rugby league club. Sunnynook residents have access to the Northern Busway rapid transit bus link via the Sunnynook busway station.

Demographics

Sunnynook had a population of 5,538 at the 2018 New Zealand census, an increase of 417 people (8.1%) since the 2013 census, and an increase of 504 people (10.0%) since the 2006 census. There were 1,734 households, comprising 2,769 males and 2,772 females, giving a sex ratio of 1.0 males per female, with 1,116 people (20.2%) aged under 15 years, 1,353 (24.4%) aged 15 to 29, 2,616 (47.2%) aged 30 to 64, and 450 (8.1%) aged 65 or older.

Ethnicities were 45.2% European/Pākehā, 6.0% Māori, 3.8% Pacific peoples, 49.2% Asian, and 4.8% other ethnicities. People may identify with more than one ethnicity.

The percentage of people born overseas was 57.6, compared with 27.1% nationally.

Although some people chose not to answer the census's question about religious affiliation, 46.2% had no religion, 38.3% were Christian, 0.2% had Māori religious beliefs, 3.5% were Hindu, 2.4% were Muslim, 2.1% were Buddhist and 2.1% had other religions.

Of those at least 15 years old, 1,569 (35.5%) people had a bachelor's or higher degree, and 390 (8.8%) people had no formal qualifications. 717 people (16.2%) earned over $70,000 compared to 17.2% nationally. The employment status of those at least 15 was that 2,358 (53.3%) people were employed full-time, 651 (14.7%) were part-time, and 195 (4.4%) were unemployed.

Education
 Wairau Intermediate is an intermediate (years 7–8) school with a roll of  students as of  It opened in 1980. 
 Sunnynook Primary School is a contributing primary (years 1–6) school with a roll of  students as of  It opened in 1968. Both schools are coeducational.

Gallery

Notes

External links
Wairau Intermediate website
Sunnynook Primary School website

Suburbs of Auckland
North Shore, New Zealand